The Iowa House of Representatives is the lower house of the Iowa General Assembly, the upper house being the Iowa Senate. There are 100 seats in the Iowa House of Representatives, representing 100 single-member districts across the state, formed by dividing the 50 Senate districts in half. Each district has a population of approximately 30,464 . The House of Representatives meets at the Iowa State Capitol in Des Moines.

Unlike the upper house, the Iowa Senate, state House representatives serve two-year terms with the whole chamber up for re-election in even-numbered years. There are no term limits for the House.

Leadership of the House
The Speaker of the House presides over the House as its chief leadership officer, controlling the flow of legislation and committee assignments. The Speaker is elected by the majority party caucus, followed by confirmation of the full House on passage of a floor vote. Other House leaders, such as the majority and minority leaders, are elected by their respective party caucuses according to each party's strength in the chamber.

Leaders

Committee leadership 
All chairs and vice chairs are a member of the majority party, with the chair serving as the presiding officer and the vice chair the alternate presiding officer. Ranking members are the chief representative of the minority party on the committee. 

*All chairs and vice chairs are members of the Republican Party of Iowa. All ranking members are members of the Democratic Party of Iowa.

Current composition

Past composition of the House of Representatives

Past notable members

 William S. Beardsley, governor of Iowa from 1949 to 1954
 William W. Belknap, U.S. Army major general and U.S. secretary of war from 1869 until he resigned under threat of impeachment in 1876.
 Terry Branstad, governor of Iowa from 1983 to 1999 and 2011 to 2017
 Dale M. Cochran, speaker of the Iowa House of Representatives from 1975 to 1978 and Iowa secretary of agriculture from 1987 to 1998.
 Abby Finkenauer, former U.S. representative, 2019 to 2021
 Robert D. Fulton, governor of Iowa for 16 days in 1969
 Chuck Grassley, current U.S. Senator, 1981 to present
 Frank Merriam, governor of California from 1934 to 1939
 William M. Stone, Civil War prisoner of war and governor of Iowa from 1864 to 1868.
 James Wilson, U.S. secretary of agriculture from 1897 to 1913.

Qualifications
A state representative must be at least 21 years of age. Other qualifications include U.S. citizenship, Iowa residency for at least one year, and district residency of 60 days prior to election.

See also
List of current members of the Iowa House of Representatives
Iowa Senate

References

External links

Iowa Legislature official government website

State House of Iowa at Project Vote Smart
Iowa House Democrats
Iowa House Republicans

1846 establishments in Iowa
State lower houses in the United States